Goes is a city in the Netherlands.

Goes or GOES may also refer to:

Places
 Goès, a commune in the Pyrénées-Atlantiques département in France
 Goes railway station, a depot in the city of Goes in the Netherlands
Goes Station, Ohio, a small unincorporated community in northern Xenia Township, Greene County, Ohio, United States

Other uses
 Goes (beetle), a genus of longhorn beetles in the family Cerambycidae
 Goes (surname)
 Goes!, 2016 video game
 Geostationary Operational Environmental Satellite (GOES), a system of weather-research satellites
 Global Online Enrollment System (GOES), the predecessor to the U.S. Customs and Border Protection's TTP Trusted Traveler System

See also
 
Gois (disambiguation)